Rajyashree Kumari (born 4 June 1953) is a former competition shooter from India. The Arjuna Award in shooting was conferred on her in 1968, when she was 16 years old.She is the daughter of Dr. Karni Singh, Maharaja of Bikaner, daughter of Maharaja Maharani Sushila,

She currently is the chairperson of The Maharaja Ganga Singhji Trust and the owner of the Lalgarh Palace. Rajyashree runs many charitable trusts and resides in Bikaner. She got married at an early age, but got divorced due to differences. she has one daughter, Anupama Kumari, and a son Sajjan Sinh.

References

Sportswomen from Rajasthan
Indian female sport shooters
Skeet shooters
1953 births
Recipients of the Arjuna Award
Living people
Rajasthani people
Trap and double trap shooters
People from Bikaner
20th-century Indian women
20th-century Indian people